Paul John Weitz (born November 19, 1965) is an American screenwriter, director and producer. He is the older brother of filmmaker Chris Weitz. Together they worked on the comedy films American Pie and About a Boy; for the latter, they were both nominated for the Academy Award for Best Adapted Screenplay. Weitz is also a writer, executive producer, and director of the Amazon Prime Video web series Mozart in the Jungle.

Early life 
Weitz was born in New York City, the son of actress Susan Kohner and Berlin-born novelist/menswear designer John Weitz. His brother is filmmaker Chris Weitz. Weitz is the grandson of Czech-born agent and producer Paul Kohner and actress Lupita Tovar on his maternal side. Tovar, who was from Oaxaca, Mexico, starred in Santa, Mexico's first talkie, in 1932, as well as a Mexican version of Drácula. Weitz' paternal grandparents escaped Nazi Germany, where his grandfather had been a successful textile manufacturer, and family intimates of Christopher Isherwood and Marlene Dietrich.

Weitz's father and maternal grandfather were Jewish, whereas his maternal grandmother was Catholic. He was raised in a nonreligious household.

Weitz attended the Allen-Stevenson School with his brother and Collegiate. In 1988, he graduated from Wesleyan University. While at Wesleyan, Weitz studied under film instructor Jeanine Basinger.

Career

Early career 
Weitz' early career involved many collaborations with his brother. Some of the work they have done as screenwriters has been both credited and uncredited.

Weitz began his film career as a co-writer on the 1998 animated film Antz. He followed this with work on various sitcoms such as Off Centre and the 1998 revival of the 1977 series Fantasy Island. In 1999, he and Chris directed and produced American Pie, which was written by Adam Herz, and became a major box office success. Weitz returned as executive producer on the film's two theatrical sequels.

In 2002, the Weitz brothers co-wrote and co-directed About a Boy, the Hugh Grant film based on the book by Nick Hornby. The film was originally set up at New Line Cinema with Robert De Niro producing, and the main character as an American. The brothers felt that it was important that the character is British. Inspiration came from the film The Apartment (1960). They were nominated for an Academy Award for Best Adapted Screenplay.

Weitz has written and directed the well-received romantic comedy In Good Company and the political satire American Dreamz, which faced mixed reviews. Additional writing credits include the television show Cracking Up.

He has also directed an adaptation of Darren Shan's young adult novel Cirque du Freak called The Vampire's Assistant. He directed the film Little Fockers (2010), the sequel to Meet the Parents and Meet the Fockers.

Subsequently he wrote and directed Being Flynn, an adaptation of Nick Flynn's memoir Another Bullshit Night in Suck City, starring Robert De Niro. Weitz said he worked collaboratively with Flynn to translate the dense original source material into its film adaptation.

Weitz also directed the movie Admission, starring Tina Fey.

Grandma 
In 2015, Weitz directed the film, Grandma, which starred Lily Tomlin. The film premiered at the 2015 Sundance Film Festival on January 30, as the closing night film. The film was Tomlin's first leading role in 27 years, after co-starring with Bette Midler in the comedy film Big Business (1988). It is the second collaboration between Tomlin and Weitz, who previously directed her in his film Admission (2013). The film was released on August 21, 2015, by Sony Pictures Classics.

Weitz had the story idea for many years, but it never fully formed until he met and worked with Tomlin on Admission, saying that "After meeting Lily, the voice and the character really clicked, I had thought about it for years, so I had a lot of it worked out in my head, and then I just went to a coffee shop and wrote it longhand."

Weitz said the film cost under $600,000 to make. It was well received.

In development 
Weitz has a production company with his brother Chris Weitz and producer Andrew Miano called Depth of Field. In March 2016, Weitz and his brother signed a two-year first look deal with Amazon Studios.
 A live-action adaptation Michael Moorcock's Elric saga, which his brother Chris said he enjoyed as a child. Weitz's Depth of Field production company was meant to create the films as a potential trilogy for Universal Pictures. In a May 2007 interview with Empire magazine Weitz's brother announced that he had met with Moorcock, who trusted him with the films, and described his wish for Paul to direct the film.
 Shield of Straw – producing an English remake of the 2013 Japanese action thriller, Shield of Straw
 Ghost Train – producing a remake of the 2006 Japanese horror film, Soul Reviver
 Birthright – producing a remake of the 2010 Japanese thriller
 Sinatoro – producing TV series with Grant Morrison for Universal Television

Playwright 
While in college at Wesleyan, Weitz wrote the play Mango Tea, which was performed Off-Broadway.

Weitz has written a number of plays, including Roulette, Privilege, Show People and Trust, all of which have been produced Off-Broadway in New York City. Trust starred Zach Braff, Bobby Cannavale, Sutton Foster, and Ari Graynor, and was directed by Peter DuBois at Second Stage Theatre. It will be produced in Brazil, Germany and Greece in 2013. Second Stage previously produced Privilege and Show People and produced Lonely, I'm Not, starring Topher Grace and Olivia Thirlby a new comedy by Weitz in 2012. Lonely, I'm Not was a New York Times critics pick.

As a writer, Weitz has discussed semi-jokingly the fact that he avoids the discomfort in his life by turning to the act of writing. He sees a good play structure as being very different from a good film structure, and thinks that it is rare for plays as source material to be easily adapted into film.

Personal life 
In 2001, Weitz married novelist Patricia Brown, with whom he has three children.

Filmography

Films 

Acting roles

Television

Works and publications 
 Weitz, Paul. All for One: A Play in Two Acts. New York: Samuel French, 1995.  
 Ensemble Studio Theatre in New York City, opened December 2, 1993. With John Speredakos, Calista Flockhart, Liev Schreiber, Michael Louis Wells, Noelle Parker
 Weitz, Paul. Roulette. New York: Dramatists Play Service, Inc, 2004.  
 Ensemble Studio Theatre at John Houseman Theatre in New York City, opened February 18, 2004. With Larry Bryggman, Ana Gasteyer, Shawn Hatosy, Leslie Lyles, Anna Paquin, Mark Setlock, Grant Shaud
 Weitz, Paul. Privilege. New York: Dramatists Play Service, Inc, 2006.  
 Second Stage Theatre in New York City, opened April 25, 2005. With Harry Zittel, Conor Donovan, Carolyn McCormick, Florencia Lozano, Bob Saget
 2006: Nominated for Lucille Lortel Award - Conor Donovan, Outstanding Lead Actor
 2005: Won the Theatre World Award - Conor Donovan
 Weitz, Paul. Show People. New York: Dramatists Play Service, 2007.  
 Second Stage Theatre in New York City, opened April 6, 2006. With Ty Burrell, Judy Greer, Debra Monk, Lawrence Pressman
 Weitz, Paul. Trust. New York: Dramatists Play Service, 2011.  
 Second Stage Theatre in New York City, opened August 12, 2010. With Zach Braff, Sutton Foster, Ari Graynor, Bobby Cannavale
 2011: Won, Artios Award - Best New York Theatre, Comedy/Musical (Mele Nagler)
 Weitz, Paul. Lonely, I'm Not. New York: Dramatists Play Service, 2013.  
 Second Stage Theatre in New York City, opened May 7, 2012. With Mark Blum, Lisa Emery, Topher Grace, Christopher Jackson, Maureen Sebastian, Olivia Thirlby
 2012: Nominated for Henry Hewes Design Award - Mark Wendland for Scenic Design, Emily Rebholz for Costume Design

References

External links 

 
 

1965 births
20th-century American dramatists and playwrights
20th-century American male writers
Living people
American male screenwriters
American male dramatists and playwrights
Collegiate School (New York) alumni
Comedy film directors
American people of Czech-Jewish descent
American people of German-Jewish descent
American people of Mexican descent
Film directors from New York City
Wesleyan University alumni
Screenwriters from New York (state)
Kohner family